Mikhail Spiridonovich Erassi (1828–?) was a Russian painter, professor of landscape painting, academician and professor of the Imperial Academy of Arts.

Biography
Mikhail Erassi was born in 1828. He studied at the Imperial Academy of Arts under Professor Vorobyov. During his studies, he was awarded several prizes.

In 1853, as a pensioner of the Academy of Arts, he was sent abroad for two years, but in 1856 he applied for a postponement of his stay abroad for another two years to continue his studies under the guidance of the famous artist Alexander Kalama. For his part, Kalama also asked to leave Erassi to improve his skills.

In 1857 Michail Erassi was elevated to the rank of academician and in 1862 he was elected professor of landscape painting. Erassi was strongly influenced by Kalam and had almost perfectly assimilated the techniques of the latter. His subjects were often Swiss landscapes. Three views sent by him from Switzerland to St.-Petersburg gave him the title of academician and the views of Four Forest Canton, Lake Geneva and Reichenbach Falls made him a professor at the Academy.

The Emperor Alexander III Museum (now the State Russian Museum) acquired the following paintings by Erassi: "The shore of Lake Leman near Chambery", "Switzerland", "View near Vyborg, in Finland" and "Winter Landscape".

Mikhail  Erassi died in Prussia in the 1880s.

Gallery

References

External links
 Brief Biographies. Erassi Mikhail Spiridonovich.

19th-century painters from the Russian Empire
1828 births
Year of death missing